Shri Kuruvathi Basaveshwara temple  at Kuruvathi (Kannada: ಕುರುವತ್ತಿ) is one of the ancient and historic temples at the extreme south-western corner of Hoovina Hadagali taluk, Vijayanagara District, Karnataka, India. This temple is on the bank of Tungabhadra river, 10 km from Halavagalu and 2 km from Mylara and 36 km from Ranebennur and 326 km from Bangalore.

Geography

The temple is located at latitude 14.78427° north, longitude 75.702455° east, and has an elevation of 515 meters above sea level.

History

Origin
Kurubara Hatti=Kuru+Hatti=Kuru+vatti=
Kuruvathi (Kannada: ಕುರುವತ್ತಿ) got its name because the Lord Basaveshwara/Nandi came here to heal the kuru (Kannada: ಕುರು) — the wounds of the devotees.

Shri Kuruvathi Basaveshwara is one of the forms of Nandi. The holy temple (Kannada: ಕುರುವತ್ತಿ) is dedicated to Nandi who is in the form of a bull. It is believed that Lord Nandi came here in search of Lord Shiva (Sri Mallikarjuna Swamy), found him on the bank of Tungabhadra River, sat in front of him and started worshiping him from then on.

Ancient history

Shri Kuruvathi Basaveshwara Swamy Temple is around 600 years old, built in accordance with Vijayanagara architecture ( ವಿಜಯನಗರ ವಾಸ್ತುಶಿಲ್ಪ) during the period (1336–1565).

Lord Nandi, also known as Basaveshwara or Basavanna, is believed by followers to be a very merciful, being the fulfiller of every wish made to him by the devotees. He provides the blessing to the people by healing the wounds of their life. Lord Nandi is worshiped here as the main deity. In Kuruvathi, Lord Basaveshwara's idol is 10 feet long and 9 feet high. Here Lord Basaveshwara fulfills the request of the devotees and bless them and their families if one offers prayer to him from Bhakti.

This temple consist of a Garbhagriha, sukanasi, a Navaranga connecting the sanctum and outer Mandapa and a Rangamantapa. The Mandapa are built on square or polygonal plinths with carved friezes that are four to five feet high and have ornate stepped entrances on all four sides with miniature elephants or with beast. The Mandapas are supported by ornate pillars.

Kuruvathi (Kannada: ಕುರುವತ್ತಿ) is also known as Dakshina Kashi/Varanasi, as the Tungabhadra river flows from east to west, because in Kashi/Varanasi the Ganges river flows from east to west.

The holy mantra chanted here is "Jaya Namaha Pravathi Patheye Hara Hara Maha Deva", "Om Namaha Shivaya" and "Om Shri Kuruvathi Basaveshwaraya Namaha".

Shri Mallikarjuna Swamy Temple
Shri Mallikarjuna Swamy Temple is around 900 years old, built in Western Chalukya architecture style (Kannada: ಪಶ್ಚಿಮ ಚಾಲುಕ್ಯ ವಾಸ್ತುಶಿಲ್ಪ) also known as Kalyani Chalukya. Kalyani Chalukya or Later Chalukya architecture is the distinctive style of ornamented architecture that evolved during the rule of the Western Chalukya Empire in the Tungabhadra region of central Karnataka, India, during the 11th and 12th centuries. Chalukyan temples fall into two categories — the first being temples with a common mantapa (a colonnaded hall) and two shrines (known as dvi kuta) and the second being temples with one mantapa and a single shrine (eka kuta). Since the contribution of Kalyani Chalukya had very great prominence during his reign (Chalukya dynasty), the Lord Shri Mallikarjuna Swamy Temple is now under the protection of the Archeological Department.

Lord Shiva who killed the demons at this place and revealed himself in a form of Lingam and is known as Sri Mallikarjuna Swamy. This shrine belongs to Eka kuta category which consist of a Mahamantapa, three Navaranga connecting the sanctum and outer Mandapa and a Rangamantapa, three Dwaar and a Garbhagriha. These three Navaranga have Mahamantapas that are fabulous and spectacularly incarnated by Kalyani Chalukya and these in turn leads us to Sukanasi. This Sukanasi finally leads us to Garbhagriha where Lord Shiva resides. The Shiva Lingam is of 4 feet height.

The Rangamantapa has 12 pillars which are triangular in all three directions and is 8 feet high and 4 feet wide, where we can find Lord Ganesha who is 5 feet tall and Lord Subramanya, Karnataka along with Lord Mallikarjuna Swamy. The ornate pillars that support the roof of the mandapa are monolithic shafts from the base up to the neck of the capital.

There are three entrances. Each of these dwaars are beautifully incarnated with the traditional design that influences the Western Chalukya architecture. The Goddess Shri Bhuvaneshwari's idol is beautifully incarnated on the Main Dwaar.

Temple activities

Priest activities

The priest here is Somashekara who performs the daily puja for the Lord Nandi. This puja is done only by this priest family. There are some special Puja  performed during the time of festivals and during Maha Shivaratri. Holige and ghee is served as Naivedya to Lord Nandi. In Kartika a special puja to the Lord Nandi and Mallikrjuna Swamy is made. The maha Rathothsava is on Maha Shivaratri amavasya (new moon) day during February–March.

Temple car festival activities

Devotees from all over Karnataka and other near by states in India visit this place during Kuruvathi Theru (temple car festival-Rathothsava) held during the time of Maha Shivaratri. The Lord Nandi idol is kept inside the ratha and then it moves based on the particular Nakshatra named Magha that match at some point of time. This Ratha does not move unless and until Nakshatra matches Magha (nakshatra). Once the Nakshatra is matched, devotees will be able to pull the ratha by chanting mantra "Jaya Namaha Pravathi Patheye Hara Hara Maha Deva", "Om Namaha Shivaya" and "Om Shri Kuruvathi Basaveshwaraya Namaha","Basavanna Dhareye Ninagaru Sariye, Sari Sari Yendavara, Hallu Muriye Bhoupara", "Hatti Halada Mara Sutta Bevina Mara Uttati Vanadalliruva Belli Basaveshwaranige Bhoupara". Later when the ratha starts moving, the devotees then offer flower garlands, coconuts and banana fruits to the Lord Nandi ratha.

Prasadam activities
The devotees are provided with Prasadam (food) on the amavasya (new moon) day of every month which is provided by the devotees in form of Dana.

Terminology

 Theru: Rathothsava
 Mandapa: A porch-like structure through the (Gopuram) (ornate gateway) and leading to the temple
 Mahamantapa: Open pillared hall
 Rangamantapa: Closed pillared hall
 Garbhagriha: Sanctum where the idol of God is placed
 Navaranga or Antrala: Passage that connects to Sanctum
 Sukanasi: Antechamber
 Dwaar: Entrance

Transport

Road

 Bangalore-Chitradurga-Ranebennur-Guttal**-Mylara**-Kuruvathi.
 Bangalore-Harihara-Halavagalu**-Kuruvathi.
 Bellary-Hospet-Harpanahalli-Kuruvathi.
 Dharwar-Hubli-Haveri-Guttal**-Mylara**-Kuruvathi.

There are no direct buses to reach Kuruvathi, but K.S.R.T.C. (Karnataka State Road Transport Corporation) buses are available up to certain place. For all the place marked with ** at the end, one needs to go for own vehicle or local private transport (Auto rickshaw and Tempo Trax).

Railway station

Bangalore-Ranebennur-Dharwar: Alight at Ranebennur and board the local private transport.
Dharwar-Devaragudda-Bangalore: Alight at Devaragudda and board the local private transport.

There are no direct trains available for Kuruvathi; private transport (Auto rickshaw and Tempo Trax) are available from Ranebennur or Devaragudda.

Airports
The nearest airport is at Hubli. An international airport is at Bengaluru.

References

Hindu temples in Vijayanagara district